1998 World Championships may refer to:

 1998 Aerobic Gymnastics World Championships
 1998 ATP Tour World Championships
 1998 BDO World Darts Championship 
 1998 FIBA World Championship for Women
 1998 FIBA World Championship 
 1998 FIVB Men's World Championship
 1998 FIVB Women's World Championship
 1998 Ford World Women's Curling Championship
 1998 IAAF World Cross Country Championships 
 1998 IBF World Junior Championships 
 1998 IAAF World Half Marathon Championships 
 1998 ICF Canoe Sprint World Championships 
 1998 IIHF World Championship
 1998 Individual Speedway Junior World Championship 
 1998 ISF Women's World Championship 
 1998 Men's World Floorball Championships 
 1998 Men's World Ice Hockey Championships
 1998 PDC World Darts Championship 
 1998 Superbike World Championship
 1998 Trampoline World Championships 
 1998 UCI Cyclo-cross World Championships 
 1998 UCI Road World Championships
 1998 UCI Track Cycling World Championships 
 1998 World Aquatics Championships 
 1998 World Fencing Championships 
 1998 World Figure Skating Championships 
 1998 World Ice Hockey Championships (disambiguation)
 1998 World Junior Figure Skating Championships 
 1998 World Junior Ice Hockey Championships 
 1998 World Lacrosse Championship 
 1998 World Rhythmic Gymnastics Championships
 1998 World Rowing Championships 
 1998 World Series
 1998 World Snooker Championship 
 1998 World Weightlifting Championships 
 1998 World Wrestling Championships 
 1998 World Weightlifting Championships
 Biathlon World Championships 1998
 FIBT World Championships 1998
 FIDE World Chess Championship 1998
 FIL World Luge Natural Track Championships 1998
 FIS Ski-Flying World Championships 1998
 Paralympics: 1998 IPC Athletics World Championships